"Fast" Faldir Chahbari (Riffian-Berber: ⴼⴰⵍⴷⵉⵔ ⵛⴰⵀⴱⴰⵔⵉ; born August 30, 1979) is Moroccan-Dutch former welterweight kickboxer who fought out of Morocco. He a x2 Muay Thai amateur world champion and is the former (and first ever) World Full Contact Association (W.F.C.A.) Thai-boxing junior middleweight world champion.

Biography

Faldir Chahbari began boxing at the Kickboxing brummen gym in 1994, and started in youth matches 2 years later. Trained at the time by Kenneth Macnack, he now has his own gym giving training sessions in Zutphen and Apeldoorn. He has only one functioning eye, after losing the use of the other eye in an accident as a child.

Career

Chahbari spent most of his early career fighting in the Netherlands.  He won his first major title at the Battle of Arnhem II event in 2001 where he won the I.K.B.O. European title.  He followed up this victory by winning the W.P.K.L. Dutch national title the very next year.  In 2004 he added another national title to his resume, this time with the W.F.C.A., following up with the European version in 2005 with a win against the talented knockout specialist Murat Direkçi.  Between the years 2000 and 2006 he picked up some decent wins, defeating the likes of Marco Piqué and Gago Drago and retained his W.P.K.L. and W.F.C.A. national and European titles in other bouts.  He also had a successful amateur career, winning two gold medals at the W.M.F. world championships held in Bangkok, Thailand and a silver at the W.A.K.O world championships held in Agadir, Morocco.

In 2006 Chahbari entered the K-1 MAX Netherlands 2006 in a bid to qualify for a reserve fight at the K-1 World MAX 2006 Final,  He made his way through to the K-1 MAX Netherlands final in Utrecht but had his dreams of a flight to Yokohama scuppered by the experienced Rayen Simson who defeated him after an extension round.  The following year he retained his W.F.C.A. European title by knocking out Chris Venrooij with a knee after just 15 seconds.  Although he had missed out on a place at the K-1 MAX final the previous year, Chahbari did make his way to Japan where he took part in a number of Shoot Boxing events in Tokyo, winning one and losing one.  In 2008, as W.F.C.A. European champion he met multiple world champion Albert Kraus, defeating him over five rounds to become the first ever W.F.C.A. world title holder at junior middleweight (under 70 kg).  He held on to the belt until early 2010 when he lost to the highly decorated Andy Souwer who became the new champion.  Since 2006 he has suffered more defeats as the competition has got tougher, losing to the likes of Buakaw Por. Pramuk and Giorgio Petrosyan, but has still shown himself to be a contender winning a KlasH tournament late in 2010 by defeating Shemsi Beqiri.

Titles

Professional 
Mix Fight Championship
2010 Mix Fight Gala 11 - KlasH tournament champion -72.5 kg

World Full Contact Association
2008-10 W.F.C.A. Thai-boxing world champion -69.85 kg (1 title defence)
2006 K-1 MAX Netherlands 2006 runner up -70 kg
2004-07 W.F.C.A. Thai-boxing European champion -69.85 kg
2004-07 W.F.C.A. Thai-boxing Dutch champion -69.85 kg

World Professional Kickboxing League
2002-03 W.P.K.L. Thai-boxing Dutch champion -67 kg

International Kickboxing Organization
2001 I.K.B.O. Thai-boxing European champion -67 kg

Amateur 
2005 W.A.K.O. World Championships in Agadir, Morocco  -71 kg (Thai-Boxing) 
2005 W.M.F. World Championships  -70 kg (Muay Thai)
2003 W.M.F. World Championships  -67 kg (Muay Thai)

Kickboxing record 

|-  bgcolor="#CCFFCC"
| 2013-04-13 ||Win ||align=left| Goran Borović || Beast of the East || Zutphen, Netherlands || Decision ||5  ||3:00 
|-
! style=background:white colspan=9 |
|-
|-  bgcolor="#CCFFCC"
| 2013-02-17 ||Win ||align=left| Antonio Gomez ||  || Arnhem, Netherlands || Decision ||3  ||3:00 
|-
|-  bgcolor="#CCFFCC"
| 2012-05-27 || Win ||align=left| Bovy Sor Udomson || SLAMM: Nederland vs. Thailand VII || Almere, Netherlands || Decision (Unanimous) || 5 || 3:00
|-  bgcolor="#CCFFCC"
| 2011-11-19 || Win ||align=left| Omar Amrani || SUPERKOMBAT World Grand Prix 2011 Final || Darmstadt, Germany || Decision (Unanimous) || 3 || 3:00 
|-  bgcolor="#CCFFCC"
| 2011-04-23 || Win ||align=left| Anthony Kane || Beast of the East 2011 Zutphen || Zutphen, Netherlands || Decision (Unanimous) || 3 || 3:00 
|-
|-  bgcolor="#CCFFCC"
| 2010-11-27 || Win ||align=left| Shemsi Beqiri || Mix Fight Gala 11, Final || Sindelfingen, Germany || Decision (Split) || 3 || 3:00
|-
! style=background:white colspan=9 |
|-
|-  bgcolor="#CCFFCC"
| 2010-11-27 || Win ||align=left| Arian Vatnikaj || Mix Fight Gala 11, Semi Finals || Sindelfingen, Germany ||  KO (Knee strike) || 3 || 
|-
|-  bgcolor="#CCFFCC"
| 2010-11-27 || Win ||align=left| Omar Amrani || Mix Fight Gala 11, Quarter Finals || Sindelfingen, Germany || Decision (Unanimous) || 3 || 3:00
|-
|-  bgcolor="#FFBBBB"
| 2010-06-12 || Loss ||align=left| Marcus Öberg || Beast of the East 2010 Poland || Gdynia, Poland || Ext.R Decision (Unanimous) || 4 || 3:00
|-
|-  bgcolor="#FFBBBB"
| 2010-01-30 || Loss ||align=left| Andy Souwer || Beast of the East 2010 Zutphen || Zutphen, Netherlands || Decision || 5 || 3:00
|-
! style=background:white colspan=9 |
|-
|-  bgcolor="#c5d2ea"
| 2009-11-08 || Draw ||align=left| Leroy Kaestner || Heroes Fight Event || Apeldoorn, Netherlands || Decision Draw || 3 || 3:00
|-
|-  bgcolor="#FFBBBB"
| 2009-10-17 || Loss ||align=left| Nieky Holzken || Ultimate Glory 11: A Decade of Fights || Amsterdam, Netherlands || Ext.R Decision (Unanimous) || 4 || 3:00
|-
|-  bgcolor="#CCFFCC"
| 2009-07-25 || Win ||align=left| Ricardo Fernandes || Night of the Stars || Tetouan, Morocco || Decision || 3 || 3:00
|-
|-  bgcolor="#CCFFCC"
| 2009-06-13 || Win ||align=left| Hafid el Boustati || Gentlemen Fight Night 6 || Tilburg, Netherlands || Decision (Unanimous) || 3 || 3:00
|-
|-  bgcolor="#FFBBBB"
| 2009-05-16 || Loss ||align=left| Giorgio Petrosyan || It's Showtime 2009 Amsterdam || Amsterdam, Netherlands || Decision (Unanimous) || 3 || 3:00
|-
|-  bgcolor="#CCFFCC"
| 2009-01-24 || Win ||align=left| Mohammed Gur || Beast of the East 2009 || Zutphen, Netherlands || Decision || 3 || 3:00
|-
! style=background:white colspan=9 |
|-
|-  bgcolor="#CCFFCC"
| 2008-11-29 || Win ||align=left| Orono Wor Petchpun || It's Showtime 2008 Eindhoven || Eindhoven, Netherlands || Decision (Majority) || 3 || 3:00
|-
|-  bgcolor="#CCFFCC"
| 2008-07-06 || Win ||align=left| Davit Kiria || Ultimate Glory 8 || Nijmegen, Netherlands || TKO (Doc Stop/Cut) || 2 || 
|-
|-  bgcolor="#FFBBBB"
| 2008-04-26 || Loss ||align=left| Buakaw Por. Pramuk || K-1 World GP 2008 Amsterdam, Super Fight || Amsterdam, Netherlands || Decision (Split) || 3 || 3:00
|-
|-  bgcolor="#c5d2ea"
| 2008-03-15 || Draw ||align=left| Murat Direkçi || It's Showtime 75MAX Trophy Final 2008, Super Fight || 's-Hertogenbosch, Netherlands || Decision Draw || 5 || 3:00
|-
|-  bgcolor="#CCFFCC"
| 2008-01-26 || Win ||align=left| Albert Kraus || Beast of the East 2008 || Zutphen, Netherlands || Decision || 5 || 3:00
|-
! style=background:white colspan=9 |
|-
|-  bgcolor="#c5d2ea"
| 2007-11-24 || NC ||align=left| Ali Gunyar || Shootboxing in the Autotron || Rosmalen, Netherlands || No Contest || 3 || 3:00
|-
|-  bgcolor="#FFBBBB"
| 2007-10-28 || Loss ||align=left| Kazunori Yokota || Shootboxing Battle Summit Ground Zero || Tokyo, Japan || Decision || 3 || 3:00
|-
|-  bgcolor="#CCFFCC"
| 2007-06-02 || Win ||align=left| Jan van Denderen || Gentlemen Fight Night 2007 || Tilburg, Netherlands || Decision || 5 || 3:00
|-
|-  bgcolor="#CCFFCC"
| 2007-02-25 || Win ||align=left| Taiga Yamaguchi || Shoot Boxing Warriors 2007 MU-SO 1 || Tokyo, Japan || Decision (Unanimous) || 3 || 3:00
|-
|-  bgcolor="#CCFFCC"
| 2007-01-27 || Win ||align=left| Chris van Venrooij || Beast of the East 2007 || Zutphen, Netherlands || KO (Knee) || 1 || 0:15
|-
! style=background:white colspan=9 |
|-
|-  bgcolor="#CCFFCC"
| 2006-12-09 || Win ||align=left| Rayen Simson || || Roosendaal, Netherlands || TKO (Corner Stoppage) || 3 ||
|-
|-  bgcolor="#CCFFCC"
| 2006-11-12 || Win ||align=left| Ali Gunyar || 2H2H: Pride & Honor || Rotterdam, Netherlands || Decision (Unanimous) || 5 || 3:00
|-
|-  bgcolor="#CCFFCC" 
| 2006-06-04 || Win ||align=left| Chahid Oulad El Hadj || Gentleman Fightnight III || Tilburg, Netherlands || Decision (Unanimous) || 5 || 3:00
|-
|-  bgcolor="#CCFFCC"
| 2006-04-08 || Win ||align=left| Frane Radnic || Beast of the East 2006 || Zutphen, Netherlands || Decision (Unanimous) || 5 || 3:00
|-
|-  bgcolor="#FFBBBB"
| 2006-03-26 || Loss ||align=left| Rayen Simson || K-1 MAX Netherlands 2006, Final || Utrecht, Netherlands || Ext.R Decision || 4 || 3:00
|-
! style=background:white colspan=9 |
|-
|-  bgcolor="#CCFFCC"
| 2006-03-26 || Win ||align=left| William Diender || K-1 MAX Netherlands 2006, Semi Finals || Utrecht, Netherlands || Decision || 3 || 3:00
|-
|-  bgcolor="#CCFFCC"
| 2006-03-26 || Win ||align=left| Menno Dijkstra || K-1 MAX Netherlands 2006, Quarter Finals || Utrecht, Netherlands || Decision || 3 || 3:00
|-
|-  bgcolor="#CCFFCC"
| 2006-02-25 || Win ||align=left| Hisayuki Kanazawa || Rising Sun 7 || Beilen, Netherlands || KO || 1 || 
|-
|-  bgcolor="#CCFFCC"
| 2006-02-04 || Win ||align=left| Gago Drago || WFCA Gala || Roosendaal, Netherlands || Decision (Unanimous) || 5 || 3:00
|-
|-  bgcolor="#CCFFCC"
| 2006-01-31 || Win ||align=left| Hamid El Caid || Time For Action || Nijmegen, Netherlands || TKO || 2 || 
|-
! style=background:white colspan=9 |
|-
|-  bgcolor="#CCFFCC"
| 2005-11-13 || Win ||align=left| Murat Direkçi || WFCA Thai-Kickbox Gala || Nijmegen, Netherlands || Decision (Unanimous) || 5 || 3:00
|-
! style=background:white colspan=9 |
|-
|-  bgcolor="#CCFFCC"
| 2005-10-02 || Win ||align=left| Melvin Rozenblad || The Battle of Arnhem IV || Arnhem, Netherlands || Decision || 5 || 3:00
|-
|-  bgcolor="#CCFFCC"
| 2005-04-09 || Win ||align=left| Roel Rink || Beast of the East 2005 || Zutphen, Netherlands || KO || 3 || 
|-
|-  bgcolor="#CCFFCC"
| 2005-01-31 || Win ||align=left| Hamid el Caid || Time for action || Nijmegen, Netherlands || TKO ||  || 
|-  bgcolor="#CCFFCC"
| 2004-04-10 || Win ||align=left| Coskun Dağ || Beast of the East || Zutphen, Netherlands || Decision (Unanimous) || 5 || 3:00
|-
! style=background:white colspan=9 |
|-
|-  bgcolor="#CCFFCC"
| 2004-02-22 || Win ||align=left| Kieran Keddle || Thunder & Lightning IX || London, England, UK || Decision || 5 || 3:00 
|-  bgcolor="#CCFFCC"
| 2003-09-28 || Win ||align=left| Kieran Keddle || W.P.K.L. Muay Thai Champions League XI || Rotterdam, Netherlands || Decision || 5 || 3:00 
|-  bgcolor="#FFBBBB"
| 2003-06-08 || Loss ||align=left| Fikri Tijarti || It's Showtime 2003 Amsterdam || Amsterdam, Netherlands || Decision || 5 || 3:00
|-
|-  bgcolor="#CCFFCC"
| 2003-04-19 || Win ||align=left| Rachied el Haddad || Beast of the East || Zutphen, Netherlands || TKO (Knockdown/leaving the ring) || 3 || 
|-
! style=background:white colspan=9 |
|-
|-  bgcolor="#CCFFCC"
| 2002-10-27 || Win ||align=left| Noel Soares || Beast of the East, Sporthal Elderveld|| Arnhem, Netherlands || KO (Knee strike) || 3 || 
|-
|-  bgcolor="#CCFFCC"
| 2002-03-04 || Win ||align=left| Adil Boukhari || W.P.K.L. Champions League VI || Rotterdam, Netherlands || Decision || 5 || 3:00
|-
|-  bgcolor="#CCFFCC"
| 2001-11-03 || Win ||align=left| Marco Piqué || Gala in Brediushal || Amsterdam, Netherlands || Decision || 5 || 2:00
|-
|-  bgcolor="#FFBBBB"
| 2001-01-30 || Loss ||align=left| Marino Deflorin || K-1 Holland GP 2001 in Arnhem, Super Fight || Arnhem, Netherlands || Decision (Unanimous) || 5 || 3:00
|- 
|-  bgcolor="#CCFFCC"
| 2000-09-03 || Win ||align=left| Marcel Doomernik || The Battle for Arnhem II || Arnhem, Netherlands || Decision || 5 || 3:00
|-
! style=background:white colspan=9 |
|-
|-  bgcolor="#CCFFCC"
| 2000-05-20 || Win ||align=left| Chris van Venrooij || Showdown 2 || Netherlands || Decision || 5 || 3:00
|-
|-
| colspan=9 | Legend:

See also 
List of male kickboxers
List of K-1 Events

References

External links 
Team Beast of the East Official Homepage

Dutch male kickboxers
Moroccan male kickboxers
Welterweight kickboxers
Dutch Muay Thai practitioners
Moroccan Muay Thai practitioners
People from Brummen
Moroccan emigrants to the Netherlands
Living people
1979 births
SUPERKOMBAT kickboxers
Sportspeople from Gelderland